The Wales National Korfball Team often referred to as the Welsh Korfball Squad (WKS) is managed by the Welsh Korfball Association/Cymdeithas Pêl-Corff Cymru, and represents Wales in international korfball competition. 
The Welsh Korfball Squad entered its first IKF ranking competition in 2007, after the Great Britain national korfball team was disbanded to produce three teams: England, Wales and Scotland. Wales is a fully recognised member of the International Korfball Federation and is currently ranked 18th in the world.

They played the World Championships for the first and only time in 2011, after the withdrawal of Hungary. In 2006 they reached the 3rd place in the Korfball Commonwealth Games.

Tournament results

 See also Great Britain national korfball team.

 For World games see Great Britain national korfball team.

 See also Great Britain national korfball team.

Squad
The Welsh Korfball Squad is selected by the coaching staff as appointed by the WKA.

Current squad

Most capped players
Players with an equal number of caps are ranked in chronological order of reaching the milestone.

Top goalscorers
Goalscorers with an equal number of goals are ranked with the highest to lowest goals per game ratio.

See also
Korfball in Wales
IKF World Korfball Ranking

References

External links
  Welsh Korfball Association
 International Korfball Federation

National korfball teams
Korfball
Korfball teams in the United Kingdom
Korfball in Wales